Daniel Patrick "Pat" McKittrick (born September 24, 1941) is an American politician in the state of Montana. He served in the Montana House of Representatives from 1970 to 1976. In 1975, he served as Speaker of the House. He is a lawyer.

References

1941 births
Living people
Politicians from Great Falls, Montana
Carroll College (Montana) alumni
University of Montana alumni
Montana lawyers
Speakers of the Montana House of Representatives
Democratic Party members of the Montana House of Representatives
People from Anaconda, Montana